Beat A. Stephan is a Swiss curler.

At the national level, he is a two-time Swiss men's champion curler (1988, 1990) and Swiss mixed champion curler (1984).

Teams

Men's

Mixed

References

External links
 
 

Living people
Swiss male curlers
Swiss curling champions
Date of birth missing (living people)
Place of birth missing (living people)
Year of birth missing (living people)